Charles Vevers Phythian-Adams (born 28 July 1937) is a local historian and the former head of the Centre for English Local History at the University of Leicester.

Of a gentry family, he was the eldest of three sons of Rev. William John Telia Phythian-Adams (1888–1967), and Adela (née Robinson). He was educated at Marlborough College and Hertford College, Oxford, where he took an M.A.

Selected publications
 Societies, Cultures and Kinship, 1580–1850: Cultural Provinces and English Local History
 Desolation of a City: Coventry and the Urban Crisis of the Late Middle Ages
 Re-thinking English Local History
 Land of the Cumbrians: A Study of British Provincial Origins, AD 400–1120
 The Norman Conquest of Leicestershire and Rutland
 Local History and Folklore: A New Framework

References

Living people
British local historians
British medievalists
1937 births
People educated at Marlborough College
Alumni of Hertford College, Oxford